Khaled Rajab is a Lebanon international rugby league footballer who plays as a  or  for the Canterbury-Bankstown Bulldogs in the NRL.

Background
Rajab was born in New South Wales, Australia. He is of Lebanese descent.

Playing career

Club career
In 2022, Rajab captained the Canterbury-Bankstown Bulldogs Jersey Flegg side. He also played in four games for the Bulldogs in the NSW Cup including the NSW Cup grand final loss against the Penrith Panthers NSW Cup team.

International career
In 2022, Rajab was named in the Lebanon squad for the 2021 Rugby League World Cup.

Rajab made his international debut against Ireland in 42-18 victory for Lebanon.

References

External links
Canterbury Bulldogs profile
Lebanon profile

Living people
Australian rugby league players
Australian people of Lebanese descent
Rugby league halfbacks
Rugby league five-eighths
Rugby league players from Sydney
Lebanon national rugby league team players
2002 births